The 1979 24 Hours of Le Mans was the 47th Grand Prix of Endurance, and took place on 9 and 10 June 1979. With no other major works cars this year, the Porsche team were the strong favourites to win. Their competition would be from Cosworth-powered Mirages and Rondeaus and a swarm of Group 5 and IMSA-class Porsche 935s. The other big talking point was the presence of Hollywood actor Paul Newman, driving for Dick Barbour Racing.

However, the Porsche 936s ran into problems early, as did the Mirages that inherited the lead. The race became a duel between the 935s of the rival teams from Cologne: Kremer Racing and Gelo Sportswear. Soon after midnight, heavy storms started sweeping the circuit. The rain stayed for virtually the rest of the race, dramatically slowing the pace, negating the speed of the 936s coming back through the field. Both Gelo cars retired with mechanical issues in the soggy dawn, and when the Wollek/Haywood Porsche developed a bad misfire soon after it looked like the Kremer 935 of Klaus Ludwig and the Whittington brothers had the race covered. They had a 13-lap lead over the Dick Barbour Porsche.

Then approaching 11am Don Whittington came to a stop on the Mulsanne Straight with a broken drivebelt. It took 80 minutes to get back to the pits, and by the time they got back into the race the lead down to four laps. But the charging American team were foiled by a faulty wheel-nut taking 23 minutes to fix. Then in the last hour, the car slowed with a bad misfire. Stommelen pulled up just before the finish line and waited for the Kremer car to take the flag in victory. The Kremer brothers' finest hour was sealed with their other team-car coming home in third.

Porsche finished 1-2-3-4, and the Kremer 935-K3 was the first Le Mans win by a rear-engined car. The torrential rain in the second half of the race made it the slowest Le Mans since 1958.

Regulations
In April 1978, the sports regulatory body, the CSI, was overhauled and replaced by the new international racing organisation FISA. The World Championship for Makes was revised to include both Group 5 and Group 6 racecars again, split into two categories: over and under 2-litres. FISA President, Jean-Marie Balestre was committed to bringing Le Mans back into the World Championship, but for now the Automobile Club de l'Ouest (ACO) chose to remain independent.

A change to the circuit was forced upon the ACO this year. Construction of the city's ring-road system meant the second Dunlop Bridge at the Tertre Rouge corner had to be demolished. The only other change was to move the start-time forward two hours, to 2pm, to allow the spectators more time to vote on Sunday in the European parliament elections.

A new efficiency calculation was used this year – the Index of Fuel Consumption. The total fuel used was measured as at the final pit-stop and then gauged against the cars' total distance covered, as litres per 100 kilometres. It was not exact, as no account was taken of the remaining fuel in the tanks.

Entries
The ACO received 87 applications, from which 60 were accepted to qualify for the 55 starting spots. Porsche was the only manufacturer with a works team and made up 19 of the 55 starters. Entries again came from regular specialists Mirage, De Cadenet, Rondeau and WM. There were also exploratory entries from Formula 1 constructor March and the Japanese companies of Mazda and Dome.

Note: The first number is the number of arrivals, the second the number who started.

Group 6 and GTP
The absence of the defending winners, Renault-Alpine, made the Porsche works team, strong favourites for the race win. They were now sponsored by the American oil tycoon David Thieme's Essex Petroleum. The 1978 iterations of the Porsche 936 were rebuilt on two chassis that had both been coincidentally crashed by Jochen Mass. The cars were essentially unchanged although the gearbox was strengthened after last year's woes. This year, their talismanic driver Jacky Ickx was paired with Brian Redman. The pair had driven together at the previous year's Spa 24 Hours. Ickx had just returned from Canada where he had won the Can-Am race. The second car had team regular Hurley Haywood with Bob Wollek, who had been released for the race from his regular seat with Georg Loos as a late replacement for Didier Pironi.

Porsche's competition in Group 6 would all be equipped with the Ford-Cosworth DFV engine. Mirage felt they had a genuine chance of victory this year. They were unable to renew the engine deal they had had for two years with Renault and instead reverted to its reliable workhorse, the Cosworth engine. It helped entice the sponsorship of a consortium of 250 Ford-dealerships in France. The new M10 cars sported a new streamlined, long-tail spyder bodywork, with a 20% smaller frontal area. Team driver Vern Schuppan was paired with Renault winner Jean-Pierre Jaussaud, while veteran British endurance drivers Derek Bell and David Hobbs shared the second car.

Dome Company had first appeared in Europe at the 1978 Geneva Motor Show with a road prototype. A racing version of the Dome Zero was entered. The distinctive low, angular wedge-shaped design came from Masao Ono who had worked on the Maki Formula One project. It was developed in England by a team led by former De Cadenet team manager Keith Greene. Two cars were built, with the original tested at the Fuji Speedway then debuted at the World Championship round at Silverstone It was driven by Chris Craft (also from De Cadenet) and Gordon Spice. They were joined at Le Mans by Bob Evans and former Maki driver Tony Trimmer.
André Chevalley had bought and raced the Inaltéra GTP the previous year. This year he entered two Lola Type T286 cars. Alain de Cadenet continued his personal development of the Lola T380. The new LM78 now had a wider, longer chassis to improve road-holding. Having lost his regular co-driver Chris Craft to the Dome team, De Cadenet now got local Le Mans professional François Migault in his stead. This year the car was finished in time to compete at the Silverstone round, where they finished an excellent second. Two of his earlier cars were also entered by their British owners: Peter Lovett's JC Racing and Simon Phillips.

Once again, Jean Rondeau hedged his bets by entering his cars in both the Group 6 and GTP classes. The three new cars had improved aerodynamics and suspension with Cosworths tuned by Swiss engine-specialist Heini Mader. Rondeau attracted veteran French drivers Henri Pescarolo and Jean-Pierre Beltoise for one car, and rally specialists Jean Ragnotti and Bernard Darniche, while he himself raced the GTP entry with Jacky Haran.
The other French team in GTP, Welter Racing also had a new design. The P79 refined the aerodynamic shell and kept developing the 2.7-litre Peugeot V6 engine, now with twin KKK (Kühnle, Kopp & Kausch) turbos. Three cars were ready for Le Mans, with all-French crews.

The most curious entry in Group 6 was a lavish project from March Engineering, who had been working with BMW in Formula Two. The silhouette design by John Gentry was based on the BMW M1, but as less than 400 cars had yet been built, it could not run in Group 5, nor would IMSA allow it into the GTX category. GTP rules required all four wheels be the same size, whereas this car had 16" fronts and 19" rears. In the end, it got special dispensation from the FIA to run in Group 6, in the 5-litre class normally used for American V8 engines. The car would be raced by BMW works driver Dieter Quester, alongside Ian Grob and Guy Edwards who had paired up last year with the disappointing Ibec project.

Group 6 (2-litre)
Once again, there was a big field for the 2-litre category with fifteen entries, dominated as usual by Lola and Chevron, and using a mix of ROC, Cosworth or BMW engines. The French engine-builder team, Société ROC, had three of the B36. Another Chevron (with a Brian Hart-prepared Cosworth engine) was entered by the Scottish Mogil Motors team of Tony Charnell, Robin Smith and Richard Jones.
The six Lolas were equipped with ROC, Cosworth and BMW engines – with the French Lambretta team with both a BMW and a ROC-engined car entered. The Lola-Ford of the Dorset Racing team had a special Cosworth BDX engine, developed by their local Swindon Racing Engines. Team-owners Tony Birchenhough and Brian Joscelyne were joined by Richard Jenvey and Nick Mason. The latter was the other big-name celebrity in the race, as the drummer for British band Pink Floyd (and avid Ferrari collector), though his status was overshadowed by Paul Newman.
For several seasons, Jörg Obermoser had shown success with his ToJ cars in Europe, yet this was the first year they were seen at Le Mans with Frenchman Hubert Striebig entering his BMW-powered SC206, partnered with Alain Cudini and Hughes Kirschoffer.

Group 5 and IMSA GTX
The Porsche works team had finished its development of the Porsche 935, leaving its representation in Group 5 and IMSA to their customer teams of which there were now many. The car was dominating the respective championships. The differences between the Group 5 and IMSA cars were slight, aside from drawing European teams to Group 5 and North American teams following IMSA. Although the cars were more powerful, their smaller tanks meant they would need more fuel stops, with only about 50–60 minutes endurance.

The Kremer brothers had made over 100 modifications to the standard 935-77 model in developing their next iteration, the 935-K3. Using panels made of composite materials they took off  weight, and tweaked the body-shell, mostly made of kevlar, with their own aerodynamic refinements. The 3-litre engine was fitted with twin-turbos that could put out 740 bhp, right up to a massive 800 bhp on maximum boost. They were also fitted with an air-air intercooler, unlike the air-water variety on the regular 935. Kremer Racing entered three cars: two of the new K3s for team leader Klaus Ludwig, joined by the wealthy Whittington brothers (Don and Bill), former motocross riders from Florida in one, and DRM regulars Axel Plankenhorn and "John Winter", with Philippe Gurdjian in the other. They also had a standard 935 for Laurent Ferrier/François Sérvanin/ François Trisconi. The Whittington brothers had also entered their own 935 in the IMSA class but then cancelled that entry.

The dominant team of the season had been the Gelo Sportswear team of Georg Loos. His cars had won three of the five rounds and second in another. Despite two of his winning drivers, Ickx and Wollek, being called into the works team, the two cars still had strong driver line-ups: Manfred Schurti/Hans Heyer in one and John Fitzpatrick/Harald Grohs/Jean-Louis Lafosse in the other. Alongside these premier teams were four other entries: Porsche 935s of the French ASA Cachia team, Swiss privateer Claude Haldi and German Sekurit team and the return of a De Tomaso Pantera, run by the Italian Carlo Pietromarchi.

Dick Barbour returned to Le Mans, this year with four Porsche 935s set up to the IMSA specifications, including one of the 1979 twin-turbo models. In a major publicity coup he scored two big signings as drivers: Rolf Stommelen was not needed by the Porsche works team this year. The other was the 54-year old actor Paul Newman, one of the biggest names in Hollywood of the time and nicknamed Cool Hand Luke after his character in the 1967 film. But Newman was no part-time gentleman-driver; having been a class-winning champion in the amateur SCCA Barbour's second car had the Sebring-winning trio of Bob Akin, Rob McFarlin and Roy Woods Two other 935s were in the IMSA class: a privateer effort from Formula 1 driver Jean-Pierre Jarier and Ted Field's Interscope team who had, with Danny Ongais and Hurley Haywood, won the Daytona 24 hours earlier in the year.

Ferrari's Gestione Sportiva (racing division) had now developed a proper lightened, racing version of the 512 BB for its customer teams. However, at Daytona it had shown diabolical handling. It was fitted with a lengthened streamlined body designed by Pininfarina. The 5-litre flat-12 engine got fuel-injection and was tuned to now put out 480 bhp. But this was 200 bhp less than the rival Porsche 935, which was also around 150 kg lighter. Five such cars were entered for Le Mans – two each for Charles Pozzi's French team, and Luigi Chinetti's North American Racing Team, while the Belgian Ecurie Francorchamps prepared one for their regular driver Jean Blaton, who raced under the pseudonym "Beurlys".

Hervé Poulain, French art-auctioneer, had presented the world with a successive series of BMW Art Cars at Le Mans. This year he had the BMW M1, entered in the IMSA class and he had his car painted by American pop artist Andy Warhol. After production difficulties, it was in production and had finally been homologated. The 3.5-litre engine was fuel-injected and could put out 470 bhp. The model had debuted at the Nürburgring in April and started in the races of the new one-make Procar series. With a special exhaust and plastic rear window, the car had to run in the IMSA class. Poulain had the services of works driver Manfred Winkelhock, along with Marcel Mignot.

Mazda had been competing successfully in the IMSA GTU category, with their new RX-7 and Yojiro Terada getting a class victory at Daytona. An RX-3 had entered the 1975 race run by privateer Claude Buchet. This year, Mazda sent its RX-7 to Le Mans, but with only a single IMSA class it was set against the far more powerful Porsches and Ferraris. The drivers were Terada, Buchet and Tetsu Ikuzawa.

Group 4 GT
The Group 4 class had a smaller field of just six entries, all of which were privateer teams running the 3-litre turbocharged Porsche 934. They comprised three French, two Swiss and a German team. Last year's class-winner Anne-Charlotte Verney had taken the opportunity to upgrade from the 911 Carrera, and had rally driver René Metge as one of her co-drivers. The Swiss Lubrifilm team had hired the experienced veteran Herbert Müller.

Practice and Qualifying
As was expected, the two Porsche 936s comfortably put in the fastest times to claim the first two places on the grid. Bob Wollek set the fastest time, 3:30.1, on Wednesday but the next lap had a tyre blow-out at top speed on the Hunaudières Straight. It was a very similar incident to what had happened to Jochen Mass at the Silverstone race, the previous month. Ickx recorded his time of 3:31.4 on Thursday before Brian Redman missed a gear-change and over-revved the engine, forcing the mechanics to do an engine-change before the race. Modified wheel rims, fashioned overnight at Porsche's factory at Weissach, were also fitted to both cars as insurance against further sudden punctures.

Third quickest was Klaus Ludwig in the Kremer K3. His time of 3:34.6 was actually faster than Stommelen got in the "Moby Dick" works 935 the previous year (3:39.3). He was two seconds faster than the rival Gelo Porsche of Manfred Schurti, that had also needed a full engine change. Fifth was Schuppan's Mirage from Ragnotti's Rondeau. Stommelen had the fastest IMSA lap, of 3:49.8, to qualify 16th, with Jarier second fastest in 21st (3:55.7). The fastest Ferrari was the Ballot-Léna/Gregg/Leclère Pozzi car well back in 28th (4:00.8). They were just ahead of the leading 2-litre Group 6 of the ROC Chevron (4:01.3). Last car on the grid was the underwhelming Aston Martin with a sluggish 4:24.5.

The slowest qualifiers of each class would be culled from the starting grid. Not surprisingly, the heavy March-BMW failed – Guy Edwards' best lap (3:59.4) was almost 30 seconds slower than the pole-time, and eight seconds outside the 110% rule. The Mazda RX-7, despite being 5 seconds faster than the Aston Martin, also fell afoul of that rule, as slowest in the IMSA class.

Race

Start
Although the week had been cloudy, race-day was sunny and hot, attracting a big crowd for the 2pm start. Pescarolo did not even complete the formation lap, having to pit the Rondeau with low fuel-pressure and starting from the pit-line at the back of the field. From the start, the two Porsche 936s took the lead in formation. At the end of the first lap, Ickx led the pair, already with a ten-second jump on Ludwig and the rest of the field. By lap 3, the two Mirages had moved up to third and fourth ahead of the 935s. At the first pit-stops Ickx was delayed when the new wheel-rims had to be changed because they were locking against the brake callipers. This gave Wollek a good lead. The British cars had a terrible start from sloppy preparation: De Cadenet's car pitted after just six laps: mechanics had omitted to drill a hole in the pinion to let oil reach the bearing, which caused the gearbox to quickly seize solid. Craft had the Dome running seventh on the first lap, but pitted next time around with a fire caused by a distributor lead that had not been properly attached. After losing seven laps, they ran out of petrol at Mulsanne because of a faulty fuel-pump. By saving fuel, the other Dome had got into fifth, but were then thwarted at the first stops with a blown head-gasket.

After two hours, Wollek led Ickx by eighty seconds, with Bell a further fifty seconds back. Schuppan was a lap back in fourth and the 935s of Ludwig, Fitzpatrick, Schurti and Plankenhorn a further lap back with the Rondeau of Pescarolo. Just after Redman had taken over for his first stint, he got a puncture at the Dunlop curve. He spun the car to avoid the barriers, but had to crawl round most of a lap on the rim to get back to the pits where almost an hour was lost repairing the heavy damage to bodywork and one of the radiators. They resumed 17 laps down. At the same time, Jaussaud found his Mirage gearbox full of neutrals and was marooned out on the circuit. A mechanic was sent out to shout instructions and Jaussaud was able to fashion repairs to jam the second-gear cog into position to get back to the pits. Rebuilding the gearbox took four hours, and despite hard driving by Jaussaud and Hobbs, niggly issues meant they missed the minimum distance at half-time by three laps and were disqualified. In the fourth hour, the Wollek/Haywood car started to misfire badly. Losing a half-hour, it took 4 stops and 8 laps, in the pits replacing the fuel-injection pump and filter to solve the problem. This put the Bell/Hobbs Mirage into the lead (despite not having a first gear). Now joined by Schuppan they held the lead for a further three hours, until just before nightfall, until the perennial vibration issues of the Cosworth DFV caused exhaust problems, costing a half-hour in the pits.

With the demise and delay of the Group 6 cars, this left the lead to be contested between the 935s of the Gelo team and the Ludwig/Whittingtons Kremer K3. The other Kremer car, of Plankenhorn, "Winter" and Gurdjian was running fourth. But at the 8pm pit-stops, spilt fuel ignited and exploded with such force that it blew the engine cover off the car. Only the bravery of a fire marshal prevented greater damage. Once repaired they were able to rejoin the race.

Night
All through the night, the two Cologne teams battled for the lead, while the IMSA-leading 935 of Dick Barbour was further back in fourth. The worst accident of the race happened soon after 10pm, when Marc Sourd in the ROC Chevron crashed at the new Tertre Rouge corner. Although the driver was uninjured, a flag marshal was taken to hospital in a serious condition. Late on Saturday night, Schuppan had a narrow escape in the remaining Mirage. It was suffering an over-charging alternator that suddenly shorted out the headlights. This happened as he was coming through the quick Porsche Curves. Clipping the barriers on both sides of the road he was lucky the damage to the back end was light, but 50 minutes was lost repairing it. The electrical issue remained a potential problem again throughout the night, although the drivers pressed on hard.

The two 936s were the fastest cars on the track and quickly moving back up through the field. At midnight, after ten hours, the Gelo Porsches of Schurti and Fitzpatrick sandwiched the Kremer 935. Wollek was fourth ahead of a pack of 935s: the IMSA cars of Barbour and Interscope, then the other Kremer, Haldi and Sekurit cars. The leading Pozzi Ferrari (of Ballot-Léna/Gregg/Leclère) rounded out the top-10. Herbie Müller's 934 had run like clockwork and was sitting in 13th. The Mamers/Raulet WM led GTP, running 16th while the Mogil Chevron was fighting the Lambretta Lola for the lead of the 2-litre Group 6. Then soon after midnight the clear weather of Saturday gave way to drizzle, then torrential rain that lasted all night dramatically slowing the race pace.

By half-time Wollek and Haywood were back up to third while Ickx/Redman were seventh. Jacky Ickx came to a stop on the circuit when his car broke its drivebelt. In the darkness he installed the spare belt incorrectly. A mechanic sent out with another one was spotted by officials throwing it across the track and they were disqualified for receiving outside assistance.

The Gelo Porsches stopped soon after 4am, within minutes of each other when they were running second and fourth. Firstly Fitzpatrick suffered a spectacular turbo fire in the engine that lit up the pits. The damage was repairable until an over-exuberant fire marshal smothered the engine with foam. Then less than a quarter hour later, Schurti was in the pits with an engine failure.

Morning
At 6am, as the soggy dawn tried to break through, the Kremer Porsche had got through the night with a sizeable lead over the Barbour car. The Porsche 936 was third ahead of three other 935s – of the Kremer, Haldi and Sekurit teams. Seventh was the BMW from the French ASA-Cachia Porsche. Ninth, having a very reliable run was the Lubrifilm Porsche 934 with a big lead in Group 4. The two Pozzi Ferraris were split by the stationery Ickx/Redman 936, then came the Belgian Ferrari and the recovering Rondeau of Ragnotti/Darniche in 14th.

By 7am, the Wollek/Haywood car got back up to second but was then stopped by engine problems. Although it got going again, its race was done and it would retire two hours later after many more pitstops. This left the Kremer Porsche with a clear 13-lap lead over the Dick Barbour car. At 7.50am, the Leclère Ferrari (running 3rd in class behind its Pozzi teammate in 10th) collided with one of the ROC Chevrons breaking for Mulsanne corner. The 2-litre was turfed over the barrier and the Ferrari was also too damaged to continue though neither driver was injured. Ninety minutes later, the other Pozzi car, running sixth overall, ruined its radiators and gearbox running over debris and going off-road to avoid a spinning car. After losing a cylinder in the third hour, the BMW had steadily made up places as others fell around them. After getting through the worst of the rain they were in seventh until halted for over an hour to repair the clutch, dropping them back to fourteenth.

What could have been an easy cruise to the finish for the Kremer team was abruptly curtailed at 10.40am when Don Whittington came to a stop on the Hunaudières straight. The toothed fuel-pump drivebelt had come off. He carried a spare on-board but could not fit it. Surprising the pit-crew, he managed to fashion a repair with the spare alternator belt instead and crawl back to the pits. But that had all taken 80 minutes, then another 15 for the repairs. With the lead down to just four laps and a damaged car, they got back on the track soon after noon.

Finish and post-race

An improbable Hollywood ending for Newman was on the cards until the team was foiled by an intransigent wheel-nut locking tight, forcing it to be sawn off and a complete hub replacement, taking 23 minutes (6 laps). Stommelen pushed hard but then with just 20 minutes to go, he slowed dramatically with a bad misfire. Finally defeated by a holed piston, he crept round for two more painful laps until pulling up just before the finish line. Being sure to keep his engine running to avoid disqualification, he waited for the Kremer car to come past and take the flag before inching over the line to take second.

The second K3, having driven back up the field to eighth after its engine fire was unlucky to have a driveshaft fail in the last hours that dropped them down to finish 13th. However, the third team car, of Ferrier/Servanin/Trisconi kept up its reliable run to finish third, capping an excellent weekend for the Kremer team. Fourth, after its own metronomic run was the Group 4 Porsche of Herbie Müller and the Swiss Lubrifilm team. Finishing just a lap off the podium it won its class by an enormous 31 laps.
	
The remaining Mirage had been struggling with water getting into the electrics throughout the latter half of the race. With less than an hour to go, at its last pitstop, the car refused to restart. For forty minutes the crew tried to get it going, as regulations stated every car had to only be started by onboard means. Horsman had (illegally) rigged up a slave battery and tried to disguise restarting the car but when Bell had the car stall on him going up the pitlane, they were out.

The Ragnotti/Darniche Rondeau finished fifth, winning the Group 6 class 13 laps ahead of team-mates Pescarolo/Beltoise who finished tenth. Both cars had been hampered throughout the latter half of the race with water getting into the electrics. Despite its trials and tribulations, the new BMW carried on to finish sixth. Winning the GTP category was the WM of Raulet/Mamers/Saulnier in 14th, just the second time one of their cars had finished. 
Once again the 2-litre Sports class was decimated by unreliability. The class winner, finishing 17th, was the Mogil Chevron-Cosworth of Charnell/Smith/Jones. They had endured wet electrics and a number of flat batteries. Four laps behind them was the Dorset Racing Lola of Birchenhough/Jenvey/Joscelyne/Mason. After initially losing an hour with a broken rocker arm it had run reliably. Third in the class (12 laps further back) was the surviving Lambretta Lola, that had been the early class-leader.

It was a triumph for the Whittington brothers in only their second year of professional racing. But as "Motor" magazine put on their headline, it was "the day the winner came second": the spectators' favourite, Paul Newman, had almost pulled it off and got the biggest ovation when he took the podium with his team-mates. The decade has started with one movie star making a film about the race and ended with another almost winning it. With the 935-K3, this was the first Le Mans won by a rear-engined car. This record capped a great race for Porsche – finishing 1-2-3-4, as Jaguar had done in 1957, and winning all four of the classes they had been represented in. The torrential rain in the second half of the race made it the slowest Le Mans since 1958; the total distance was down fully 17% on the previous year.

A month later, the next event of the World Championship was at Watkins Glen. After the lead changed hands 12 times over the 6 hours, it ended with the same result for the same drivers, with the Ludwig and the Whittington brothers again beating home the Barbour/Stommelen/Newman car. Overall, Klaus Ludwig had a very successful season with the Kremer Porsche, winning 11 of the 12 races it was entered in.

Official results

Finishers
Results taken from Quentin Spurring's book, officially licensed by the ACO Class Winners are in Bold text.

Did Not Finish

Did Not Start

Class Winners

Note: although all classes, by definition, set speed records for the revised circuit, none exceeded the previous distance records.

Index of Fuel Consumption

Note: Only the top ten positions are included in this set of standings.

Statistics
Taken from Quentin Spurring's book, officially licensed by the ACO
 Fastest Lap in practice –B. Wollek, #14 Porsche 936-79– 3:30.1secs; 
 Fastest Lap –J.-Ickx, #12 Porsche 936-79 – 3:36.1secs; 
 Winning Distance – 
 Winner's Average Speed – 
 Attendance – 150,000

Citations

References
 Clarke, R.M. - editor (1997)    Le Mans 'The Porsche Years 1975-1982'    Cobham, Surrey: Brooklands Books  
 Clausager, Anders (1982)    Le Mans London: Arthur Barker Ltd  
 Armstrong, Doug – editor (1979)    Automobile Year #27 1979/80 Edita SA  
 Laban, Brian (2001)    Le Mans 24 Hours London: Virgin Books   
 Spurring, Quentin (2011)    Le Mans 1970-79 Yeovil, Somerset: Haynes Publishing  
 Wimpffen, János (2007)    Spyders and Silhouettes Hong Kong: David Bull Publishing

External links
 Racing Sports Cars – Le Mans 24 Hours 1979 entries, results, technical detail. Retrieved 25 Aug 2021
 Le Mans History – Le Mans History, hour-by-hour (incl. pictures, quotes, YouTube links). Retrieved 25 Aug 2021
 World Sports Racing Prototypes – results, reserve entries & chassis numbers. Retrieved 25 Aug 2021
 Team Dan – results & reserve entries, explaining driver listings. Retrieved 25 Aug 2021
 Unique Cars & Parts – results & reserve entries. Retrieved 25 Aug 2021
 Formula 2 – Le Mans results & reserve entries. Retrieved 25 Aug 2021
 YouTube – Colour footage (poor quality) of the race, in French (25mins). Retrieved 16 Sep 2021
 YouTube – the winning Kremer K3 car described by Bruce Meyer (3mins). Retrieved 16 Sep 2021
 YouTube – News article about Paul Newman at Le Mans, in French (3mins). Retrieved 16 Sep 2021

24 Hours of Le Mans races
Le Mans
1979 in French motorsport